The Hăghig is a right tributary of the river Olt in Romania. It discharges into the Olt in the village Hăghig.

References

Rivers of Romania
Rivers of Covasna County